Louis Joseph Andriessen (6 June 1939 – 1 July 2021) was a Dutch composer, pianist and academic teacher. Considered the most influential Dutch composer of his generation, he was a central proponent of The Hague school of composition. Although his music was initially dominated by neoclassicism and serialism, his style gradually shifted to a synthesis of American minimalism, jazz and the manner of Stravinsky.

Born in Utrecht into a musical family, Andriessen studied with his father, the composer Hendrik Andriessen as well as composers Kees van Baaren and Luciano Berio. Andriessen taught at the Royal Conservatory of The Hague from 1974 to 2012, influencing notable composers. His opera La Commedia, based on Dante's Divine Comedy, won the 2011 Grawemeyer Award for Music Composition and was selected in 2019 by critics at The Guardian as one of the most outstanding compositions of the 21st century.

Life and career
Andriessen was born in Utrecht on 6 June 1939 to a musical family, the son of the composer Hendrik Andriessen and Johanna Justina Anschütz (1898–1975). His father was professor of composition at the Royal Conservatory of The Hague, and later its director. His siblings are composers Jurriaan Andriessen and Caecilia Andriessen (1931–2019), and he is the nephew of Willem Andriessen (1887–1964).

Andriessen originally studied with his father and Kees van Baaren at the Royal Conservatory of The Hague, graduating in 1961 with a first prize, before embarking upon two years of study with Italian composer Luciano Berio in Milan and Berlin. His father introduced him to the works of Francis Poulenc and Eric Satie which he came to love. From 1961-65, Andriessen wrote for the daily De Volkskrant, and for De Gids magazine from 1966-69. Andriessen lived in Amsterdam starting in 1965.

In 1969, he was part of a group of protesters at a concert of the Concertgebouw Orchestra. They disrupted the concert with nutcrackers and bicycle horns, handing out leaflets on the dismal representation of Dutch new music in the orchestra's programming. The next year, he and the other "Nutcrackers" were given one-week prison sentences, and yet their protest sparked something of a social reform in the Dutch music scene.

Andriessen was internationally recognised as a composer with his 1976 De Staat which included texts from Plato's Republic. He was one of the founders of the Hague School, an avant-garde and minimalist movement from the second half of the 20th century. In later decades, he accepted commissions from major orchestras, including the San Francisco Symphony, the Los Angeles Philharmonic, the BBC Symphony Orchestra and the New York Philharmonic. Andriessen was the focus of festivals in Tanglewood (1994), London (1994; 2002), Tokyo (2000), Brisbane (2001) and New York (2004). In 2008, he was elected an honorary member of the International Society for Contemporary Music ISCM. He held the Richard and Barbara Debs Composer's Chair at Carnegie Hall during the 2009–10 season.

Ensembles 

In 1969, Andriessen co-founded Studio voor Elektro-Instrumentale Muziek STEIM in Amsterdam. In opposition to the classical orchestra, a structure seen as "hierarchical", he also helped founding the instrumental groups Orkest de Volharding and Hoketus, both of which performed compositions of the same names, formed by classical, jazz and pop musicians. He later became closely involved with the Schonberg and Asko ensembles and inspired the formation of the British ensemble Icebreaker.

Teaching 

Andriessen joined the faculty of the Royal Conservatory in 1974. He taught instrumentation from 1974 to 1978 and taught composition there from 1978 to 2012, where he influenced notable students including Michel van der Aa, Richard Ayres and Steve Martland. Yale University invited him in 1987 to lecture on theory and composition, he was also guest lecturer at New York State University, Buffalo (1989) and Princeton (1996). The arts faculty of the University of Leiden appointed him professor in 2004. One of his students was Raminta Šerkšnytė, a lithuanian pianist and composer.

Personal life 
Andriessen was married to guitarist Jeanette Yanikian (1935–2008). They were a couple for over 40 years, and were married in 1996. La Commedia is dedicated to Yanikian. He was married in 2012 a second time to violinist Monica Germino, for whom he wrote several works. In December 2020, she announced that the composer was suffering from dementia. He died on 1 July 2021 in Weesp at age 82.

Style and notable works
Andriessen began in the style of an intentionally dry neoclassicism, but then turned into a strict serialist. His early works show experimentation with various contemporary trends: post-war serialism (Series, 1958), pastiche (Anachronie I, 1966–67), and tape (Il Duce, 1973). His reaction to what he perceived as the conservatism of much of the Dutch contemporary music scene quickly moved him to form a radically alternative musical aesthetic of his own. From the early 1970s on he refused to write for conventional symphony orchestras and instead opted to write for his own idiosyncratic instrumental combinations, which often retain some traditional orchestral instruments alongside electric guitars, electric basses, and congas. Andriessen repeatedly used his music for political confessions and messages, but he also referred to painting and philosophy. His range of inspiration was wide, from the music of Charles Ives in Anachronie I, the art of Mondriaan in De Stijl, and medieval poetic visions in Hadewijch, to writings on shipbuilding and atomic theory in De Materie Part I.

Andriessen's later style is a unique blend of American sounds and European forms. His mature music combines the influences of jazz, American minimalism, Igor Stravinsky, and Claude Vivier. The music consists of minimalist polyrhythms, lyrical melodic fragments, predominantly consonant harmonies disrupted by explosive blocks of concentrated dissonance. Andriessen's music thus departs from post-war European serialism and its offshoots. By the 21st century he was widely regarded as Europe's most important minimalist composer.

His notable works include Workers Union (1975), a melodically indeterminate piece "for any loud sounding group of instruments" whose score specifies rhythm and contour but not exact pitch; Mausoleum (1979) for two baritones and large ensemble; De Tijd (Time, 1979–81) for female singers and ensemble; De Snelheid (Velocity, 1982–83), for three amplified ensembles; De Materie (Matter, 1984–88), a large four-part work for voices and ensemble; collaborations with filmmaker and librettist Peter Greenaway on the film M is for Man, Music, Mozart and the operas Rosa: A Horse Drama (1994) and Writing to Vermeer (1998); and La Passione (2000–02) for female voice, violin and ensemble.  His opera La Commedia, based on Dante's Divine Comedy, is particularly renowned; it won the 2011 Grawemeyer Award for Music Composition and was selected in 2019 by critics at The Guardian as No 7 of the then most outstanding compositions of the 21st century.

Awards and honours
 1959 Gaudeamus International Composers Award
 1977 Matthijs Vermeulen Award for De Staat
 1977 UNESCO International Rostrum of Composers in Paris
 1992 Matthijs Vermeulen Award for M. is for Man, Music and Mozart; Facing Death, Dances, Hout en Lacrimosa
 1993 Edison Award
 2010 Honorary doctorate from the Birmingham City University
 2011 Grawemeyer Award for Music Composition for the multimedia opera La Commedia (2004–2008).
 2016 Marie-Josée Kravis Prize for New Music
 2019 Honorary doctorate from the University of Amsterdam

Works
Andriessen's primary publishers are Boosey & Hawkes and Donemus.
Complete list of works: 
 Rondo Barbaro (1954) for piano
 Sonata (1956) for flute and piano (dedicated to Lucas van Regteren Altena)
 Elegy (1957) for cello and piano
 Elegy (1957) for double bass and piano (arrangement by Quirijn van Regteren Altena)
 Nuit d'été (1957) for piano four hands
 Quartet in two movements (1957) for string quartet
 Séries (1958) for 2 pianos
 Nocturnen (1959) (text by the composer) for 2 sopranos, orchestra (dedicated to Jeanette Yanikian)
 Percosse (1959) for flute, trumpet, bassoon and percussion
 Prospettive e Retrospettive (1959) for piano
 Trois Pièces (1961) for piano left hand
 Aanloop en sprongen (1961) (Rincorsa e salti) for flute, oboe and clarinet in Bb
 Ittrospezione I (1961) for piano 4 hands
 Joli commentaire (1961) for piano 4 hands
 Paintings (1961) for one flutist (or recorder player) and one pianist
 Étude pour les timbres (1962) for piano
 Triplum (1962) for guitar (dedicated to Jeanette Yanikian)
 Canzone 3 (Utinam) (1962) for voice and piano
 Constructions for a Ballet (1962, revision 2009) for orchestra, including Ondine, timbres voor orkest
 Plein-chant (1963) for flute and harp (dedicated to Eugenie van des Grinten and Veronica Reyns)
 Ittrospezione II (1963) for large orchestra
 Sweet (1964) for alto (treble) recorder (dedicated to Frans Brüggen)
 Registers (1963) for piano
 A flower song II (1964) for oboe solo
 A flower song III (1964) for violoncello solo
 Ittrospezione III (Concept I) (1964) for 2 pianos and 3 instrumental groups
 Double (1965) for clarinet and piano (dedicated to George Pieterson and Tan Crone)
 Ittrospezione III (Concept II) – Fragment (1965) tenor saxophone ad libitum, 2 pianos (section of Ittrospezione III [Concept II]; may be performed separately)
 Beatles Songs (1966) (satirical arrangements of four Beatles songs) for female voice and piano
 Souvenirs d'enfance (1954–1966) for piano. Including amongst others: Nocturne, Ricercare, Allegro Marcato, As you like it, Blokken, Strawinsky, Rondo opus 1, Étude pour les timbres, dotted quarter note = 70
 Rage, rage against the dying of the light (1966) for 4 trombones
 Anachronie I (1966–67) for large orchestra
 The Garden of Ryoan-gi (1967) for 3 electronic organs
 Worum es ging und worum es geht (1967) (with Misha Mengelberg) for orchestra
 Contra tempus (1967–1968) for large ensemble
 Choralvorspiele (1969) for barrel organ
 Anachronie II (1969) for oboe, small orchestra (4 horns, harp, piano, strings)
 Hoe het is (1969) for 52 strings and live electronics
 Sonate op. 2 nr. 1 (1969) for piano with interruptions from string quartet (based on Piano Sonata No. 1 by Ludwig van Beethoven)
  (1969) (with Reinbert de Leeuw, Misha Mengelberg, Peter Schat, Jan van Vlijmen; libretto by Hugo Claus, Harry Mulisch) Morality opera for soloists, 3 mixed choruses (4 voices each), orchestra (11 winds, 7 brass, 2 guitars, 11 keyboards, 10 strings), live electronics
 De negen symfonieën van Beethoven (1970) for ice cream bell, orchestra
 Spektakel (1970) for improvisational ensemble (saxophone [+ bass clarinet], viola, bass guitar, electronic organ [+ piano], percussion [or other instruments]), small orchestra (12 winds, 4 horns, 6 percussion)
 Vergeet mij niet (1970) (Forget me not) for oboe
 Le voile du bonheur (1966–1971) for violin and piano
 een, twee (1971) for organ, 10 instrumentalists and piano
 In Memoriam (1971) for tape
 Volkslied (1971) for an unlimited number and kinds of instruments (in all octaves) (based on the Dutch national anthem Wilhelmus van Nassouwe and on The Internationale)
 De Volharding (1972) (Perseverance) for piano and wind instruments (written for Orkest de Volharding)
 Dat gebeurt in Vietnam (1972) (That's going on in Vietnam) for wind ensemble
 Arrangement of Solidaritätslied by Hanns Eisler (1972) for wind ensemble
 Arrangement of Streikslied by Hanns Eisler (1972) for wind ensemble
 Arrangement of In C by Terry Riley (1972) for wind ensemble
 Arrangement of Bereits sprach der Welt by Hanns Eisler (1972) for wind ensemble
 Arrangement of Tango by Igor Stravinsky (1972) for wind ensemble
 Arrangement of La création du monde by Darius Milhaud (1972) for wind ensemble
 Thanh Hoa (1972) (text by Nguyen Thai Mao) for voice and piano
 Canzone 3: Utinam (1972) (text from the Book of Job) for soprano, piano, 1962; Thanh Hoa (text by Nguyen Thay Mao), voice, piano
 On Jimmy Yancey (1973) for 9 winds, piano and double bass (written for Orkest de Volharding)
 Voor Sater (1973) for wind ensemble
 Amsterdam Vrij (1973) for wind ensemble
 Il Duce (1973) for tape
 The family (1973) for ensemble (film music)
 Melodie (1972–1974) for alto recorder (or other flute) and piano
 Arrangement of Ipanema and Gavea from Saudades do Brasil by Darius Milhaud (1974) for wind ensemble
 Il Principe (1974) (text by Niccolò Machiavelli) for 2 mixed choruses, 8 winds, 3 horns, tuba, bass guitar, piano
 Wals (1974) for piano
 Symfonieën der Nederlanden (1974) for 2 or more symphonic bands (minimum 32 players)
 Nederland, let op uw schoonheyt (1975) for symphonic band
 Workers Union (1975) for any loud-sounding group of instruments
 De Staat (1972–76) (text by Plato) for 2 sopranos, 2 mezzo-sopranos, 4 oboes (3rd, 4th + English horn), 4 horns, 4 trumpets, 3 trombones, bass trombone, 2 harps, 2 electric guitars, 4 violas, bass guitar, 2 pianos (also transcribed for two pianos in 1992 by Cees van Zeeland and Gerard Bouwhuis)
 Mattheus passie (1976) (text by Louis Ferron) Music theatre work for 8 mixed voices, 2 oboes (both + English horn), Hammond organ, string quartet, double bass
 Hoketus (1975–76) for 2 panpipes, 2 alto saxophones ad libitum, 2 bass guitars, 2 pianos, 2 electric pianos, 2 congas
 Orpheus (1977) (text by Lodewijk de Boer) Music theatre work for 8 mixed voices, lyricon, electric guitar, bass guitar, synthesizer, percussion
 Symphonie voor losse snaren (1978) for 12 strings
 Laat toch vrij die straat (1978) (text by Jaap van der Merwe) for voice and piano
 Hymn to the Memory of Darius Milhaud (1978) (version of chamber work)
 Felicitatie (1979) for 3 trumpets
 Toespraak (1979) for speaker who also plays trombone
 Mausoleum (1979 rev. 1981) (texts by Mikhail Bakunin, Arthur Arnould) for 2 high baritones, orchestra (12 brass, 2 harps, cimbalom, 2 pianos, 2 percussion, minimum 10 strings, bass guitar)
 Music for the film The Alien (1980) (Rudolf van den Berg)
 George Sand (1980) (text by Mia Meyer) Music theatre work for 8 mixed voices, 4 pianos
 Un beau baiser (1980) for mixed chorus
 Messe des pauvres by Erik Satie, arrangement by Louis Andriessen for choir, 15 solo strings, accordion, contrabass clarinet and harp (1980)
 Ende (1981) for 2 alto recorders (1 player) (dedicated to Frans Brüggen)
 Anfang (1981) for sopranino recorder and piano
 De Tijd (1979–81) (text by St. Augustine of Hippo) for female chorus, percussion ensemble, orchestra (6 flutes, 2 alto flutes, 3 clarinets, contrabass clarinet, 6 trumpets, 2 harps, 2 pianos, Hammond organ, strings, 2 bass guitars)
 Commentaar (1981) (text by Wilhelm Schön) for voice and piano
 La voce (1981) (to a text by Cesare Pavese) for cello and voice
 Disco (1982) for violin and piano
 Overture to Orpheus (1982) for harpsichord
 De Snelheid (1982–83 rev. 1984) for 3 amplified ensembles
 Y después (1983) (text by Federico García Lorca) for voice and piano
 Menuet voor Marianne (1983) for piano
 Trepidus (1983) for piano
 Doctor Nero (1984) Music theatre work
 Berceuse voor Annie van Os (1985) for piano
 De Lijn (1986) for 3 flutes
 Dubbelspoor (1986 rev. 1994) Ballet music for piano, harpsichord, celesta, glockenspiel
 De Materie (1984–88) (texts from the Plakkaat van Verlatinge, Nicolaes Witsen, David Gorlaeus, Hadewijch, M.H.J. Schoenmaekers, Madame van Domselaer-Middelkoop, Willem Kloos, Marie Curie, Françoise Giroud). Music theatre work for soprano, tenor, 2 female speakers, 8 amplified mixed voices, amplified orchestra (15 winds, 13 brass, harp, 2 electric guitars, 2 pianos [one + electric piano], off-stage upright piano, celesta, 2 synthesizers, 6 percussion, minimum 9 strings, bass guitar. Two of its four sections may be performed separately as concert works: [2] Hadewijch, [3] De Stijl
 De Toren (1988, rev. 2000) for carillon
 Nietzsche redet (1989) (text by Friedrich Nietzsche) for speaker, alto flute, English horn, clarinet, bass clarinet, bassoon, 2 violins, viola, 2 celli, double bass, 2 pianos
 Flora Tristan (1990) for mixed choir a cappella (text by Fleur Bourgonje)
 Facing Death (1990) for amplified string quartet
 Facing Death (1990) for saxophone quartet (arrangement by Aurelia Saxophone Quartet)
 Dances (1991) (text by Joan Grant, choreography by Bianca van Dillen) For soprano, small orchestra (amplified harp, amplified piano, percussion, strings). May be performed as a concert work.
 M is for Man, Music, Mozart (1991) (texts by the composer, Jeroen van der Linden, Peter Greenaway) for female jazz voice, flute (+ piccolo), soprano saxophone, alto saxophone, tenor saxophone, horn, 3 trumpets, 2 trombones, bass trombone, double bass, piano (TV score; may be performed as a concert work with one additional song)
 Lacrimosa (1991) for 2 bassoons
 Lacrimosa (1991) for 2 flutes (arrangement by Manuel Zurria)
 Hout (1991) for tenor saxophone, electric guitar, piano and marimba (+ woodblocks)
 Romance voor Caecilia (1991) for piano
 Nadir en Zenit (1992) improvisations on poems by Sybren Polet for voice and piano (+ synthesizer)
 ...not being sundered (1992) (text by Rainer Maria Rilke) for soprano, flute, cello
 Song Lines (1992) for 3–6 saxophones
 Deuxième chorale (1992) for music box
 The Memory of Roses (1992) for piano (+ toy piano)
 Chorale (1992) for piano
 M is Muziek, Monoloog en Moord (1993) (text by Lodewijk de Boer) Music theatre work
 Lied (1993) for piano
 Rosa – A Horse Drama: The Death of a Composer (1993–94) (libretto by Peter Greenaway) Opera for 2 sopranos, tenor, 2 baritones, female speaker, 8 mixed voices, orchestra.
 Een lied van de zee (1994) (text by Hélène Swarth) for female voice
 Zilver (1994) for flute, clarinet, violin, cello, piano, vibraphone and marimba
 Base (1994) for piano left hand
 Odysseus' Women (1995) (text by Homer, choreography by Beppie Blankert) for 2 sopranos, 2 altos, sampler
 De komst van Willibrord (1995) for carillon
 To Pauline O (1995) for oboe
 Machmes Wos (1996) for voice, piano
 Trilogie van de Laatste Dag (1996–97) (each of its three sections may be performed separately: (i) The Last Day (texts by Lucebert, folksong A Woman and Her Lass) for boy soprano, 4 male voices, orchestra; (ii) TAO (texts by Laozi, Kotaro Takamura) for 4 female voices, piano [+ voice, koto], small orchestra [5 winds, 2 horns, harp, piano (+ celesta), 2 percussion, minimum 14 strings]; (iii) Dancing on the Bones (text by the composer) for children's chorus, orchestra, 1997)
 De herauten (1997) for 3 horns, 3 trumpets, 3 trombones, tuba, timpani
 Not an Anfang (1997) for piano
 De eerste minnaar (1998) (text by Toon Tellegen) for boy soprano, organ, 1998 (section of music theatre work Oldenbarneveldt; may be performed as a concert work)
 Tuin van Zink (1998) for viola and live electronics
 Writing to Vermeer (1997–99) (libretto by Peter Greenaway) Opera for 2 children's voices, 2 sopranos, mezzo-soprano, female chorus, orchestra (7 winds, 2 horns, 2 trumpets [2nd + bass trumpet], 2 harps, 2 electric guitars, cimbalom, 2 pianos, on-stage harpsichord, 2 percussion, minimum 22 strings), CD (music by Michel van der Aa)
 Woodpecker (1999) for percussion
 Image de Moreau (1999) for piano
 Dirck Sweelinck Missed the Prince (1999) for harpsichord
 Passeggiata in tram in America e ritorno (1999) (text by Dino Campana) for female Italian voice, violin and piano
 What Shall I Buy You, Son? (2000) for voice, piano
 Boodschappenlijstje van een gifmengster (2000) (text by the composer) for vocalist (also writes), voice (may be performed as Shopping List of a Poisoner [translated by Nicoline Gatehouse]
 Inanna's Descent (2000) for mezzo-soprano, piccolo, oboe, violin, piano, 2 percussion ensembles (4–12 total players)
 The New Math(s) (2000) (text by Hal Hartley) for soprano, transverse flute, violin, marimba, CD (music by Michel van der Aa), 2000 (film score; may be performed as a concert work)
 Feli-citazione (2000) for piano
 Passeggiata in tram in America e ritorno (2001) (text by Dino Campana) for female Italian voice, 3 trumpets, 3 trombones, electric guitar, electric violin, double bass, piano, percussion, 1998 (also version for voice, flute, horn, 3 trumpets, 3 trombones, amplified violin, double bass, piano
 De vleugels van de herinnering (2001) (text by Larissa Tiginachvili [Dutch translation]) for voice, piano
 Fanfare om te beginnen (2001) for 6 groups of horns
 La Passione (2000–02) (text by Dino Campana) for female jazz voice, violin, small orchestra (7 winds, 7 brass, electric guitar, cimbalom, 2 pianos, synthesizer, 2 percussion, 3 violins, bass guitar)
 Very Sharp Trumpet Sonata (2002) for trumpet
 Tuin van Eros (Garden of Eros) (2002) for string quartet
 Klokken voor Haarlem (Bells for Haarlem) (2002) for piano, celesta, synthesizer, vibraphone (+ glockenspiel)
 Pupazzetti by Alfredo Casella, arranged by Louis Andriessen for ensemble in 2002–2003
 Inanna (2003) texts by Hal Hartley, Theo J.H. Krispijn) for 4 voices, 3 actors, mixed chorus, contrabass clarinet, 4 saxophones, violin, film (by Hal Hartley)
 Letter from Cathy (2003) (text from a letter by Cathy Berberian to the composer) for female jazz voice, harp, violin, double bass, piano, percussion
 Tuin van Eros (2003) for violin and piano
 RUTTMANN Opus II, III, IV (2003) for flute, 3 saxophones, horn, 3 trumpets, 3 trombones, double bass, piano (film music for a film of Walter Ruttman, written for the Filmmuseum Biennale 2003)
 Haags Hakkûh (The Hague Hacking) (2003) for 2 pianos. Renamed to Haags Hakkûh Stukje (The Hague Hacking Scrap) in 2008.
 Racconto dall'inferno (2004) (text by Dante Alighieri) for female jazz voice, small orchestra (8 winds, 6 brass, guitar, cimbalom, 2 pianos, 2 percussion, minimum 8 strings, bass guitar). Part II of La Commedia (2004–08).
 De Opening (2005) for ensemble (combined Orkest de Volharding, ASKO Ensemble, Schoenberg Ensemble)
 Vermeer Pictures (2005) concert suite for orchestra from Writing to Vermeer (arrangement by Clark Rundell)
 XENIA (2005) for violin
 Hymn to the memory of Darius Milhaud for ensemble (1974/2006)
 Hellende Fanfare (Inclined fanfare; Fanfara inclinata) (2006) for voice and ensemble (Text by Dino Campana)
 Raadsels (Riddle) (2006) for solo violin
 Johann Sebastian Bach's Prelude in b minor from the Well-Tempered Clavier BWV 866, arranged for string quartet with the first six bars augmented with a viola part by Igor Stravinsky, completed by Louis Andriessen (2006)
 ..miserere... (2006–07) for string quartet
 The City of Dis or: The Ship of Fools (2007) for voices and ensemble. Part I of La Commedia (2004–08).
 La Commedia (2004–08). Film opera in five parts (texts by Dante and Vondel and from the Old Testament)
 Haags Hakkûh (The Hague Hacking) (2008) for two pianos and large ensemble
 Christiaan Andriessens uitzicht op de Amstel (Christiaan Andriessen's view on the river Amstel) (2009) for ensemble
 Life (2009) for ensemble, with film by Marijke van Warmerdam
 Anaïs Nin (2009/10) for singer, ensemble and film
La Girò (2011), for violin solo and ensemble
 Mysteriën (2013), for orchestra
 Tapdance (2013), concerto for percussion and large ensemble
 Two way ticket (2014), for piano
 Theatre of the World (2013–15), a 'grotesque stagework' in nine scenes (Libretto by Helmut Krausser)
 Mach's mit mir, Gott (Do unto me, God) (2016), for organ
 Signs and Symbols (2016), for wind ensemble and percussion
 Ahania Weeping (2016), for mixed chorus
 De goddelijke routine (The divine routine) (2017), for organ
 Rimsky or La Monte Young (2017), for piano
 Agamemnon (2017), for speaker and large orchestra
 Searching for unison (étude) (2018), for piano
 The Only One (2018), song cycle for female jazz singer and large ensemble, dedicated to Nora Fischer, who premiered the work at The Proms 2019
 May (2019), for choir and orchestra

References

Sources

Further reading
 Adlington, Robert: De Staat. Hants. (UK): Ashgate (2004). 
 Andriessen, Louis and Elmer Schonberger (trans. Jeff Hamburg): The Apollonian Clockwork: On Stravinsky Amsterdam: Amsterdam UP (reprint, 2006). 
 Everett, Yayoi Uno. The Music of Louis Andriessen. Cambridge: Cambridge University Press (2006). .
 Zegers, Mirjam (ed.): Trans. Clare Yates. The Art of Stealing Time. Arc Publications. .

External links
 
 
 Louis Andriessen / 1939 – 2021 ( biography, works list, recordings and performance search) Boosey and Hawkes 2021
 Andriessen on Andriessen (documentary)
 Louis Andriessen Nonesuch Records
 Robert Davidson: Louis Andriessen interview topologymusic.com 2001
 Composer's entry on IRCAM's database

1939 births
2021 deaths
20th-century classical composers
20th-century Dutch composers
20th-century Dutch male musicians
21st-century classical composers
21st-century Dutch composers
21st-century male musicians
Composers for carillon
Contemporary classical music performers
Dutch classical composers
Dutch classical pianists
Dutch male classical composers
Gaudeamus Composition Competition prize-winners
International Rostrum of Composers prize-winners
Male classical pianists
Minimalist composers
Nonesuch Records artists
Musicians from Utrecht (city)
Postmodern composers
Pupils of Luciano Berio
Royal Conservatory of The Hague alumni
Academic staff of the Royal Conservatory of The Hague
Twelve-tone and serial composers